The Holm of Papa (or Holm of Papay, Holm of Papa Westray and known locally as the Papay Holm,) is a very small uninhabited island in the Orkney Islands. It can be visited from its neighbouring island Papa Westray, or Papay, an island less than a hundred metres west of the Holm.

The main sight on the small island is the Southcairn, a 20 metre long chambered cairn dating from approx. 3000 BC on whose stones one can find ancient carvings. The long, stalled cairn, built of local stone, was once a communal burial place for the bones of an ancient community. It is protected by a modern roof and entered by a trapdoor from above. It is possible that the inhabitants of the Knap of Howar buried their dead here. There are three ancient chambered cairns on the holm. Visitors can arrange privately for small boat access through the Co-op shop on Papa Westray. The cairn is readily visible from the larger island.

“Eyebrow motif” carvings found in the southernmost chambered cairn  bear a resemblance to the "eyes" of the Orkney Venus found  at Links of Noltland on Westray.

Footnotes

4th-millennium BC architecture in Scotland
Uninhabited islands of Orkney
Scheduled monuments in Scotland